The Extra Lens, formerly known as The Extra Glenns, is a band made up of Franklin Bruno (of Nothing Painted Blue and The Human Hearts) and John Darnielle (of the Mountain Goats). The band acts as a side project for both artists, and stayed underground throughout the 1990s, recording tracks for singles and some compilations. Both artists primarily concentrate on their own solo work, though as their popularity has grown, they have continued to work together.

In the early 2000s, the duo decided to keep the project going, and in 2002 Absolutely Kosher Records released Martial Arts Weekend, their first full-length album.

In August 2010, it was announced that The Extra Glenns had signed to Merge Records and changed their name to The Extra Lens. The new album, Undercard, was released on October 19, 2010.  SPIN Magazine gave the record 7 out of 10 stars, calling it "vivid" and "haunting."

Discography

Compilation appearances
 "Badger Song" and "That" - High Fly Graveyard cassette (Shrimper, 1992)
 "Badger Song" - Abridged Perversion CD (Shrimper, 1994)
 "I Hear the Planets" - Fantasy Band 7" EP (Shrimper, 1994)
 "Process of Elimination" - The Long Secret CD (Harriet, 1995)
 "Sure" - Sidereal Rest CD (Scratch, 1996)
 "Gravedigger" - Extra Walt 2x7" (Walt, 1996)

References

External links
 Pitchfork Media on Martial Arts Weekend
 

Indie rock musical groups from California
Merge Records artists
Shrimper Records artists